Ryōichi, Ryoichi, Ryouichi or Ryohichi (written: 良一, 遼一, 僚一, 亮一 or 了一) is a masculine Japanese given name. Notable people with the name include:

, Japanese baseball player
, Japanese Nordic combined skier
, Japanese footballer
, Japanese composer
, Japanese politician
Ryoichi Hirano, Japanese ballet dancer
, Japanese manga artist
, Japanese businessman
, Japanese footballer and manager
, Japanese screenwriter, television director and film director
, Japanese aikidoka
, Japanese footballer
, Japanese lawyer and politician
, Japanese footballer
, Japanese businessman and politician
, Japanese ultramarathon runner
, Japanese boxer
, Japanese entomologist
, Japanese voice actor
, Japanese inventor
, Japanese sprinter

Japanese masculine given names